Manoa is a suburb of Honolulu in Hawaii.

Manoa may also refer to:
 SS Manoa, U.S. navy ship decommissioned in 1919, formerly named  
 , Matson Line liner that sailed from San Francisco to Hawaii
 Manoa (journal), a literary journal
 123290 Manoa, main-belt minor planet
 Manõa, legendary city of gold also known as El Dorado
 Manoa, Saint-Louis-du-Sud, Haiti, village in the Aquin Arrondissement of Haiti

People
 Manoa Dobui, Fijian politician, who won the Samabula Tamavua Open Constituency in the House of Representatives
 Manoa Masi (born 1974), Fijian football midfielder
 Manoa Rasigatale, Fijian politician and television personality
 Manoa Thompson (born 1968), former Australian professional rugby league footballer
 Manoa Vosawai (born 1983), Italian rugby union player
 Afaese Manoa (born 1949), Tuvaluan writer and musician
 Asenate Manoa (born 1992), Tuvaluan athlete who represented Tuvalu at the 2008 Summer Olympics
 Tim Manoa (born 1964), former professional American football player
 Samu Manoa (born 1985), American rugby union player

See also
 University of Hawaiʻi at Mānoa, university in Manoa
 Manoas, one of a number of groups of Indigenous peoples in Peru